Heliocheilus biocularis is a species of moth of the family Noctuidae first described by Max Gaede in 1915. It is found in Africa, including South Africa.

This species has a wingspan of 23 mm.

References

External links
 

Heliocheilus
Moths described in 1915
Moths of Africa